The Armee d' Orient is a name used for various historic units in the French Army, including:

Armée d'Orient (1798), the French taskforce sent by the French Directory under Bonaparte for an invasion of Egypt in 1798 
Armée d'Orient (1853), the unit sent by Napoleon III to the Crimean War
 Armée d'Orient (1915–19), the French-led field army fighting in the Balkans during World War I